William John Clifton Haley (July 6, 1925 – February 9, 1981) was an American rock and roll musician. He is credited by many with first popularizing this form of music in the early 1950s with his group Bill Haley & His Comets and million-selling hits such as "Rock Around the Clock", "See You Later, Alligator", "Shake, Rattle and Roll", "Rocket 88", "Skinny Minnie", and "Razzle Dazzle". Haley has sold over 60 million records worldwide.  In 1987, he was posthumously inducted into the Rock and Roll Hall of Fame.

Biography

Early life and career
Haley was born July 6, 1925 in Highland Park, Michigan. In 1929, the four-year-old Haley underwent an inner-ear mastoid operation which accidentally severed an optic nerve, leaving him blind in his left eye for the rest of his life. It is said that he adopted his trademark kiss curl over his right eye to draw attention from his left, but it also became his "gimmick", and added to his popularity. As a result of the effects of the Great Depression on the Detroit area, his father moved the family to Bethel Township, Pennsylvania, when Bill was seven years old.  Haley's father William Albert Haley (1900–1956) was from Kentucky and played the banjo and mandolin, and his mother, Maude Green (1895–1955), who was originally from Ulverston in Lancashire, England, was a technically accomplished keyboardist with classical training. Haley told the story that when he made a simulated guitar out of cardboard, his parents bought him a real one.

One of his first appearances was in 1938 for a Bethel Junior baseball team entertainment event, performing guitar and songs when he was 13 years old.

The anonymous sleeve notes accompanying the 1956 Decca album Rock Around the Clock describe Haley's early life and career: "When Bill Haley was fifteen [c. 1940] he left home with his guitar and very little else and set out on the hard road to fame and fortune. The next few years, continuing this story in a fairy-tale manner, were hard and poverty-stricken, but crammed full of useful experience. Apart from learning how to exist on one meal a day and other artistic exercises, he worked at an open-air park show, sang and yodelled with any band that would have him, and worked with a traveling medicine show. Eventually he got a job with a popular group known as the 'Down Homers' while they were in Hartford, Connecticut. Soon after this he decided, as all successful people must decide at some time or another, to be his own boss again – and he has been that ever since." These notes fail to account for his early band, known as the Four Aces of Western Swing. During the 1940s Haley was considered one of the top cowboy yodelers in America as "Silver Yodeling Bill Haley". One source states that Haley started his career as "The Rambling Yodeler" in a country band, The Saddlemen.

The sleeve notes conclude: "For six years Bill Haley was a musical director of Radio Station WPWA in Chester, Pennsylvania, and led his own band all through this period. It was then known as Bill Haley's Saddlemen, indicating their definite leaning toward the tough Western style. They continued playing in clubs as well as over the radio around Philadelphia, and in 1951 made their first recordings on Ed Wilson's Keystone Records in Philadelphia."  The group subsequently signed with Dave Miller's Holiday Records and, on June 14, 1951 the Saddlemen recorded a cover of the Delta Cats "Rocket 88".

Bill Haley and His Comets

During the Labor Day weekend in 1952, the Saddlemen were renamed Bill Haley with Haley's Comets. The name was inspired by the supposedly official pronunciation of Halley's Comet and was suggested by Bob Johnson, program director at radio station WPWA where Bill Haley had a live radio program from noon to 1 pm. In 1953, Haley's recording of "Crazy Man, Crazy" (co-written by Haley and his bass player, Marshall Lytle, although Lytle would not receive credit until 2001) became the first rock and roll song to hit the American charts, peaking at number 15 on Billboard and number 11 on Cash Box. Soon after, the band's name was revised to "Bill Haley & His Comets".

In 1954, Haley recorded "Rock Around the Clock". Initially, it was relatively successful, peaking at number  23 on the Billboard pop singles chart and staying on the charts for a few weeks.  On re-release, the record reached #1 on July 9, 1955.

Haley soon had another worldwide hit with "Shake, Rattle and Roll", another rhythm and blues cover in this case from Big Joe Turner,  which went on to sell a million copies and was the first rock 'n' roll song to enter the British singles charts in December 1954, becoming a gold record. He retained elements of the original (which was slow blues), but sped it up with some country music aspects into the song (specifically, Western swing) and changed up the lyrics. Haley and his band were important in launching the music known as "Rock and Roll" to a wider audience after a period of it being considered an underground genre.

When "Rock Around the Clock" appeared as the theme song of the 1955 film Blackboard Jungle starring Glenn Ford, it soared to the top of the American Billboard chart for eight weeks. The single is commonly used as a convenient line of demarcation between the "rock era" and the music industry that preceded it. Billboard separated its statistical tabulations into 1890–1954 and 1955–present. After the record rose to number one, Haley became widely popular by those who had come to embrace the new style of music. With the song's success, the age of rock music began overnight and ended the dominance of the jazz and pop standards performed by Frank Sinatra, Jo Stafford, Perry Como, Bing Crosby, Eddie Fisher, and Patti Page. 

"Rock Around the Clock" was the first record to sell over one million copies in both Britain and Germany. Later on in 1957, Haley became the first major American rock singer to tour Europe. Haley continued to score hits throughout the 1950s such as "See You Later, Alligator" and he starred in the first rock and roll musical films Rock Around the Clock and Don't Knock the Rock, both in 1956. Haley was already 30 years old, and he was soon eclipsed in the United States by the younger, sexier Elvis Presley, but continued to enjoy great popularity in Latin America, Europe, and Australia during the 1960s.

Bill Haley and the Comets performed "Rock Around the Clock" on the Texaco Star Theater hosted by Milton Berle on Tuesday, May 31, 1955, on NBC in an a cappella and lip-synched version. Berle predicted that the song would go number one: "A group of entertainers who are going right to the top." Berle also sang and danced to the song which was performed by the entire cast of the show. This was one of the earliest nationally televised performances by a rock and roll band and provided the new musical genre with a much wider audience.

Bill Haley and the Comets were the first rock and roll act to appear on the iconic American musical variety series the Ed Sullivan Show on Sunday, August 7, 1955, on CBS in a broadcast that originated from the Shakespeare Festival Theater in Stratford, Connecticut. They performed a live version of "Rock Around the Clock" with Franny Beecher on lead guitar and Dick Richards on drums. The band made their second appearance on the show on Sunday, April 28, 1957, performing the songs "Rudy's Rock" and "Forty Cups of Coffee".

Bill Haley and the Comets appeared on American Bandstand hosted by Dick Clark on ABC twice in 1957, on the prime time show October 28, 1957, and on the regular daytime show on November 27, 1957. The band also appeared on Dick Clark's Saturday Night Beechnut Show, also known as The Dick Clark Show, a primetime TV series from New York on March 22, 1958, during the first season and on February 20, 1960, performing "Rock Around the Clock", "Shake, Rattle and Roll", and "Tamiami". In 2017 Haley was inducted into the National Rhythm & Blues Hall of Fame.

Personal life

Marriages
Haley was married three times:
 Dorothy Crowe (December 11, 1946 – November 14, 1952) (divorced, two children)
 Barbara Joan Cupchak (November 18, 1952 – 1960) (divorced, five children)
 Martha Valaesco (1963 – February 9, 1981; his death, three children)

Children
Haley had at least ten children. John W. Haley, his eldest son, wrote Sound and Glory, a biography of Haley. His youngest daughter, Gina Haley, is a professional musician based in Texas. Scott Haley is an athlete. His youngest son Pedro is also a musician.

He also had a daughter, Martha Maria, from his last marriage with Martha Velasco.

Bill Haley Jr., Haley's second son and first with Joan Barbara "Cuppy" Haley-Hahn, publishes a regional business magazine. In February 2011, he formed a tribute band, performing his father's music and telling the stories behind the songs.

Last years and death
An admitted alcoholic, Haley fought a battle with alcohol into the 1970s. Nonetheless, he and his band continued to be a popular touring act, benefiting from a 1950s nostalgia movement that began in the late 1960s and the signing of a lucrative record deal with the European Sonet label. After performing for Queen Elizabeth II at the Royal Variety Performance on November 26, 1979, Haley made his final performances in South Africa in May and June 1980. Before the South African tour, he was diagnosed with a brain tumor.  Subsequently, Haley's planned tour of Germany in the autumn of 1980 had to be cancelled.

Despite his illness, Haley started compiling notes for possible use as a basis for either a biographical film based on his life, or a published autobiography (accounts differ), and there were plans for him to record an album in Memphis, Tennessee, when the brain tumor began affecting his behavior and he returned to his home in Harlingen, Texas.

The October 25, 1980, issue of German tabloid Bild reported that Haley had a brain tumor. Haley's British manager, Patrick Malynn, was quoted as saying that "Haley had taken a fit [and] didn't recognize anyone anymore." Haley was immediately taken to his home in Beverly Hills. In addition, Haley's doctor said that the tumor was inoperable. The Berliner Zeitung reported a few days later that Haley had collapsed after a performance in Texas and was taken to the hospital in his hometown of Harlingen. However, this account is questionable, as Bill Haley did not perform in the United States at all in 1980.

Haley's widow Martha, who was with him in these troubling times, denied he had a brain tumor as did his old and very close friend Hugh McCallum. Martha and friends related that Haley did not want to go on the road anymore and that ticket sales for that planned tour of Germany in the fall of 1980 were slow. McCallum said, "It's my unproven gut feeling that that [the brain tumor] was said to curtail talks about the tour and play the sympathy card."

At the same time, Haley's drinking problem appeared to be getting worse. According to Martha, by this time, she and Bill fought all the time and she told him to stop drinking or move out. Eventually, he moved out into a room in their pool house. Martha still took care of him and sometimes, he would come in the house to eat, but he ate very little. "There were days we never saw him," said his daughter Martha Maria.
In addition to Haley's drinking problems, it was becoming evident that he was also developing serious mental health issues. Martha Maria said, "It was like sometimes he was drunk even when he wasn't drinking." After being picked up by the Harlingen Police several times for alleged intoxication, Martha had a judge put Haley in the hospital, where he was seen by a psychiatrist, who said Bill's brain was overproducing a chemical, like adrenaline. The doctor prescribed a medication to stop the overproduction, but said Bill would have to stop drinking. Martha said, "This is pointless." She took him home, however, fed him and gave him his first dose. As soon as he felt better, he went back out to his room in the pool house, and the downward spiral continued until his passing.

Media reports immediately following his death indicated that Haley displayed deranged and erratic behavior in his final weeks. According to a biography of Haley by John Swenson, released in 1982, Haley made a succession of bizarre, mostly monologue late-night phone calls to friends and relatives toward the end of his life in which he was semi-coherent, his first wife has been quoted as saying, "He would call you and ramble, dwelling on the past ...". The biography also describes Haley painting the windows of his home black, but there is little other information available about his final days.

Haley died at his home in Harlingen on February 9, 1981, aged 55. He was discovered lying motionless on his bed by a friend who had stopped by to visit him. The friend immediately called the police and Haley was pronounced dead at the scene. Haley's death certificate gave "natural causes, most likely a heart attack" as being the cause. Following a small funeral service attended by 75 people, Haley was cremated in Brownsville, Texas.

Tributes and legacy
Haley was posthumously inducted into the Rock and Roll Hall of Fame in 1987. His son Pedro represented him at the ceremony. He received a star on the Hollywood Walk of Fame at 6350 Hollywood Boulevard on February 8, 1960, for his contributions to the music industry. The Comets were separately inducted into the Hall of Fame as a group in 2012, after a rule change allowed the induction of backing groups.

Songwriters Tom Russell and Dave Alvin addressed Haley's demise in musical terms with "Haley's Comet" on Alvin's 1991 album Blue Blvd. Dwight Yoakam sang backup on the tribute.

Surviving members of the 1954–55 contingent of Haley's Comets reunited in the late 1980s and continued to perform for many years around the world. They released a concert DVD in 2004 on Hydra Records, played the Viper Room in West Hollywood in 2005, and performed at Dick Clark's American Bandstand Theater in Branson, Missouri, beginning in 2006–07. As of 2014, only two members of this particular contingent were still alive (Joey Ambrose and Dick Richards), but they continued to perform in Branson and Europe. In 2019, Dick Richards, the drummer of the Comets, died at the age of 95. At least two other groups also continue to perform in North America under the Comets name as of 2014.

In March 2007, the Original Comets opened the Bill Haley Museum in Munich, Germany. On October 27, 2007, ex-Comets guitar player Bill Turner opened the Bill Haley Museum for the public.

Asteroid 

In February 2006, the International Astronomical Union announced the naming of asteroid 79896 Billhaley to mark the 25th anniversary of Haley's death.

Published biographies
 In 1980, Haley began working on an autobiography entitled The Life and Times of Bill Haley, but died after completing only 100 pages. The work is registered with the U.S. Copyright Office, but has yet to be released to the public. According to Gina Haley, Bill's youngest daughter, her father managed to complete the book on his career, and the manuscript is in possession of the Bill Haley estate.
 Bill Haley, Jr. and Peter Benjaminson, Crazy Man, Crazy: The Bill Haley Story ,(2019)
 John Swenson, Bill Haley: The Daddy of Rock and Roll,(1982)
 John W. Haley with John von Hoëlle, Sound and Glory: The Incredible Story of Bill Haley, the Father of Rock 'N' Roll and the Music That Shook the World, (1992)
 Jim Dawson, Rock Around the Clock: The Record That Started the Rock Revolution!, (2005)
 Otto Fuchs, Bill Haley: The Father of Rock 'n' Roll,, (2011)

Film portrayals

Unlike his contemporaries, Bill Haley has rarely been portrayed on screen. Following the success of The Buddy Holly Story in 1978, Haley expressed interest in having his life story committed to film, but this never came to fruition. In the 1980s and early 1990s, numerous media reports emerged stating that plans were underway to do a biopic based upon Haley's life, with Beau Bridges, Jeff Bridges and John Ritter all at one point being mentioned as actors in line to play Haley (according to Goldmine Magazine, Ritter attempted to buy the film rights to Sound and Glory).

Bill Haley has also been portrayed – not always in a positive light – in several "period" films:
 John Paramor in Shout! The Story of Johnny O'Keefe (1985)
 Michael Daingerfield in Mr. Rock 'n' Roll: The Alan Freed Story (1999) - notable for showing Haley himself playing the guitar solo on "Rock Around the Clock" during a live performance; although technically incorrect, Haley did pretend to play the solo during a 1955 appearance on The Milton Berle Show when his group lip-synched to the original recording during a period when the Comets lacked a full-time lead guitarist.
 Dicky Barrett (of The Mighty Mighty Bosstones) in Shake, Rattle and Roll: An American Love Story (also 1999) - Barrett performs a version of "Shake, Rattle and Roll" in the film that bears little resemblance to Haley's recording; a recording by the real Bill Haley is also heard in the film.

Discography

Before the formation of Bill Haley and the Saddlemen, which later became the Comets, Haley released several singles with other groups. Dates are approximate due to lack of documentation.

As Bill Haley and the Four Aces of Western Swing:

1948
 Too Many Parties and Too Many Pals (vocal by Tex King)/Four Leaf Clover Blues (Cowboy CR1201) August 1948 
1949
 Tennessee Border/Candy Kisses (Cowboy CR1202)  March 1949 

As Johnny Clifton and His String Band:

1950
 Stand Up and Be Counted/Loveless Blues (Center C102)

Many Haley discographies list two 1946 recordings by the Down Homers released on the Vogue Records label as featuring Haley. Haley historian Chris Gardner, as well as surviving members of the group, have confirmed that the two singles: "Out Where the West Winds Blow"/"Who's Gonna Kiss You When I'm Gone" (Vogue R736) and "Boogie Woogie Yodel"/"Baby I Found Out All About You" (Vogue R786) do not feature Haley. However, the tracks were nonetheless included in the compilation box set Rock 'n' Roll Arrives released by Bear Family Records in 2006.

Compositions

Bill Haley's compositions included "Four Leaf Clover Blues" in 1948, "Rose of My Heart", "Yodel Your Blues Away", "Crazy Man, Crazy", "What'Cha Gonna Do", "Fractured", "Live It Up", "Farewell, So Long, Goodbye", "Real Rock Drive", "Rocking Chair on the Moon", "Sundown Boogie", "Green Tree Boogie", "Tearstains on My Heart", "Down Deep in My Heart", "Straight Jacket", "Birth of the Boogie", "Two Hound Dogs", "Rock-A-Beatin' Boogie", "Hot Dog Buddy Buddy", "R-O-C-K", "Rudy's Rock", "Calling All Comets", "Tonight's the Night", "Hook, Line and Sinker", "Sway with Me", "Paper Boy (On Main Street U.S.A.)", "Skinny Minnie", "B.B. Betty", "Eloise", "Whoa Mabel!", "Vive le Rock and Roll", "I've Got News For You", "So Right Tonight", "Jamaica D.J.", "Ana Maria", "Yucatán Twist", "Football Rock and Roll", "Let the Good Times Roll Again" in 1979, and "Chick Safari" in 1960.

He also wrote or co-wrote songs for other artists such as "I've Got News for You" for Penny Smith in 1955 on Kahill, "Calypso Rock" for Dave Day and The Red Coats on Kapp in 1956, "Half Your Heart" with Robert J. Hayes for Kitty Nation in 1956 on Wing, "I Oughta" and "Everything But You" for Dotti Malone in 1956 also on Wing, "A.B.C. Rock" and "Rocky the Rockin' Rabbit" (among others) for Sally Starr for an album she released on Haley's own label, Clymax Records, "A Sweet Bunch of Roses" for Country and Western singer Lou Graham, "Toodle-Oo-Bamboo" for Ray Coleman and His Skyrockets on Skyrocket Records in 1959, "Always Together" for the Cook Brothers on Arcade in 1960, "Crazy Street" for The Matys Brothers on Coral Records, "The Cat" for Cappy Bianco, and "(Ya Gotta) Sing For the Ladies" and "Butterfly Love" for Ginger Shannon and Johnny Montana in 1960 on Arcade as well as "I'm Shook" and "Broke Down Baby", both of which were recorded by The Tyrones in 1958–59.

Quotations

NME – October 1955

NME – January 1957

Awards
In 1982, Haley's "Rock Around the Clock" was inducted into the Grammy Hall of Fame, a special Grammy award established in 1973 to honor recordings at least 25 years old and with "qualitative or historical significance".

In December 2017, Haley was inducted into the Rhythm and Blues Hall Of Fame.

References

Other sources
 Jim Dawson, Rock Around the Clock: The Record That Started the Rock Revolution! (San Francisco: Backbeat Books, 2005)
 John W. Haley and John von Hoëlle, Sound and Glory (Wilmington, DE: Dyne-American, 1990)
 John Swenson, Bill Haley (London: W.H. Allen, 1982)

External links
 Bill Haley's new Comets web site
  Melody Manor (Bill Haley's house) Google Map

 Bill Haley Jr. and the Comets site

 
1925 births
1981 deaths
People from Highland Park, Michigan
Bill Haley & His Comets members
American people of English descent
American radio personalities
American rock singers
American rockabilly guitarists
American male guitarists
People from Delaware County, Pennsylvania
People from Harlingen, Texas
Rock and roll musicians
American bandleaders
Decca Records artists
Songwriters from Michigan
Songwriters from Pennsylvania
Western swing performers
Yodelers
20th-century American singers
American rock guitarists
Singers from Pennsylvania
Guitarists from Michigan
Guitarists from Philadelphia
20th-century American guitarists
20th-century American male singers
Essex Records artists